Madhuri Ratilal Shah (13 December 1919 - 29 June 1989) was an Indian educationist, writer and the chairperson of the University Grants Commission. She was the chairperson of the UGC Review Committee on University System set up in 1985. She also worked as the Education Officer of the Mumbai Municipal Corporation.

Early life 
She was born in Ranpur.

Publications and awards
Madhuri Shah authored many books on education and poetry, including Without Women, No Development: Selected Case Studies from Asia of Nonformal Education for Women, Towards exploring some aspects of the relationship between education and creation of employment opportunities, Symphony: A Book of Poems Challenges to Higher Education in a Changing India, Instruction in education: Teaching technology and a series by name, Radiant English Workbook are some of her notable works.

She was awarded the fourth highest Indian civilian award of Padma Shri by the Government of India in 1977. Her life has been documented in the book, Harmony: glimpses in the life of Madhuri R. Shah, published in 1985, containing several of her interviews.

See also

 University Grants Commission

References

Further reading
 
 
 
 
 
 

Recipients of the Padma Shri in literature & education
Indian women educational theorists
Women writers from Maharashtra
Indian women poets
20th-century Indian women writers
20th-century Indian poets
20th-century Indian educational theorists
Writers from Mumbai
Poets from Maharashtra
Educators from Maharashtra
Women educators from Maharashtra
20th-century women educators
1919 births
1989 deaths